Laguncula pulchella is a species of predatory sea snail, a marine gastropod mollusk in the family Naticidae.

Description

Distribution

References

 Qi Zhongyan. 2004. Seashells of China. China Ocean Press, viii + 418 p., 193 pls.
 Torigoe K. & Inaba A. (2011) Revision on the classification of Recent Naticidae. Bulletin of the Nishinomiya Shell Museum 7: 133 + 15 pp., 4 pls.

External links

Naticidae
Gastropods described in 1842
Taxa named by William Henry Benson
Marine gastropods